This is the production discography by Mark Hoppus, an American musician and record producer. It includes a list of various guest appearances, songs produced, co-produced, written and remixed by year, artist, album and title. This does not include his work with his main projects, including Blink-182, +44, and Simple Creatures.

Hoppus has collaborated with contemporary pop punk artists, including the All-American Rejects, All Time Low, Fall Out Boy, Motion City Soundtrack, New Found Glory, Simple Plan, and New Found Glory, as well as newer artists such as Neck Deep and State Champs.

Production discography

Guest appearances

Producing

Writing

Remixes

References

Notes
 A.  Hoppus provides vocals on this City (Comma) State track that was never officially released; it surfaced online in 2011.
General
 
 

Specific

External links 

Production discographies
Discographies of American artists